József Vura (born 6 February 1955 in Paks) is a former Hungarian international handball player and handball coach, who was most recently in charge by HK IUVENTA Michalovce.

During his playing career, Vura had spells by Dunaújváros, Szondi SE and Rába ETO and he also won 19 caps for the Hungarian national team. As a head coach he managed Alcoa FKC, Váci NKSE and Győri ETO KC. Vura had his most successful period by Győr, with them he finished on a podium place five times and also reached the finals of the EHF Cup two times, but he lost the decisive match-ups on both occasions.

In May 2011 Vura signed a three-year contract with Women's Handball International League club HK IUVENTA Michalovce. In January 2012, however, following the team failed to meet the expectations of the club board, HK IUVENTA canceled Vura's contract and he was replaced by Ján Packa.

Achievements
Nemzeti Bajnokság I:
Silver Medalist: 1998, 2000
Bronze Medalist: 1999, 2001, 2002
EHF Cup:
Finalist: 1999, 2002

References

1955 births
Living people
People from Paks
Hungarian male handball players
Hungarian handball coaches
Hungarian expatriate sportspeople in Slovakia
Sportspeople from Tolna County